The Alberta Sheriffs Branch is a provincial law enforcement agency overseen by the Ministry of Public Safety and Emergency Services of the province of Alberta, Canada. Under the authority of the Peace Officer Act, Alberta Sheriffs are provincial peace officers with jurisdiction over the province of Alberta. The premier of Alberta has the authority to grant emergency police powers to all Alberta sheriffs during major emergencies within the province. The Alberta Sheriffs Branch is the largest sheriff service in Canada.

There are several divisions currently operating in various areas around the province. The sheriffs can enforce all provincial and federal acts with active enforcement depending on unit. Training is completed at the Justice and Solicitor General's Training Academy, located in Edmonton. Sheriff recruit training is a fourteen-week course consisting of classroom and field experience. Once graduated, an additional nine months of on the job training is conducted.

History

Formation of Court and Prisoner Security
During the 1980s in Alberta, the court system had a multitude of agencies that contributed to its operation. The Provincial Court of Alberta's security and operation (when referring to the process of moving prisoners to the court house for court appearances) was the responsibility of the local municipal police forces when they were inside a major municipality. Rural courthouses were the responsibility of the Royal Canadian Mounted Police (RCMP). The Court of Kings's Bench of Alberta was the responsibility of the RCMP all over the province.

Within the correctional system, moving prisoners from provincial remand and correctional centres fell to the Alberta Correctional Escort Service (ACES), which was an unarmed service with the Alberta Correctional Services. Transferring prisoners to and from federal correctional institutions was the responsibility of RCMP as the unarmed ACES were not permitted to perform these transfers.

In April 1988, Court and Prisoner Security (CAPS) was formed to free up resources tied up in the operation of the Alberta justice system. CAPS initially operated in the major city centres of Calgary and Edmonton, but eventually expanded to the smaller cities of Lethbridge, Medicine Hat, Red Deer and Wetaskiwin in September 1988. The organization when up and running fully consisted of roughly 150 sworn members.

The CAPS officers were armed special constables under the Alberta Police Act. The organization drew its sworn members primarily from retired police officers with the remainder made up of officers from Alberta Correctional Services. CAPS officers were stationed within the courthouses of Alberta being made up both of full-time salaried employees and part-time wage casuals who were only armed after training. The culture within CAPS at this time was keep their organization and employment as armed special constables (the first for Alberta) from mainstream public knowledge.

CAPS duties included transferring inmates from provincial remand and correctional centres to other provincial centres and federal correctional institutions, moving inmates to and from provincial courthouses and Alberta Court of Queen's Bench as well as providing security to the judiciary within the courtroom. CAPS constables were also able to execute outstanding warrants and take members of the public into custody from court.

Special duties

Lieutenant governor of Alberta security

In 1994, CAPS took on the responsibility for the escort of the lieutenant governor of Alberta. Initially this amounted only in the capacity of a driver; however, during the term of Lieutenant Governor Lois Hole an incident that was classified as a security breach occurred and CAPS began providing close protection security for the lieutenant governor's public appearances.

1995 premiers conference
In June 1995, Alberta hosted a premiers conference in Jasper, Alberta. Despite the increased tension in Canada and among the provincial premiers due to the 1995 Quebec Referendum, Premier Ralph Klein chose to go against the established practice of contracting the RCMP for site and personnel security. He instead  utilized CAPS constables as an armed security presence. CAPS officers were drawn from the courthouses to provide security for the site of the conference as well as the protection of the premiers' families when off site.

28th G8 Summit
In 2002, the 28th G8 summit was held in Kananaskis, Alberta. This was the first G8 summit held after the 9/11 terrorist attacks. Because of this and the fact that G8 summits have typically been the scene of multiple protests and demonstrations, special considerations were made in the interest of security.

As security assets were being pulled from around the province and even across Canada, courthouse activity in Alberta was lowered to allow the utilization of in some cases 50% of the courthouse CAPS constables.

CAPS' contribution to the security situation was twofold. Constables were provided for the security of the summit site; furthermore, CAPS was embedded with the Calgary Police Service (CPS) to aid in the transportation of mass arrests from the anticipated protest that could occur.

Changeover to Sheriffs Branch
In September 2005, the groundwork began to be laid to transform CAPS into what would become the Alberta Sheriffs Branch. The solicitor general and minister of public security reviewed a number of law enforcement activities commonly conducted by fully trained police officers.  Due to the extensive and demanding requirements of the police, a number of these areas had historically received limited attention from the police services.  It was decided to embark upon a strategy of "filling the gap", allowing police to focus their resources more effectively on their core policing issues and criminal interdiction.

What followed was a massive increase in the size of the organization and the creation of specialized units such as Traffic Enforcement, Surveillance and Fugitive Apprehension. Court Security and Prisoner Transport (formerly CAPS) was increased in size as well, finally taking over all courthouses within the province (small rural venues were still under RCMP control at this time), the creation of the Out-of-Province Escort Office for returning fugitives to Alberta as well as the implementation of perimeter security at major courthouse venues.

Services

Court Security and Prisoner Transport 

Court Security and Prisoner Transport (CSPT) is responsible for transporting prisoners from the various provincial court buildings, correctional centres and police holding cells. CSPT holds and monitor prisoners in secure cell blocks before their attendance in court, and it provides security in the courthouse, courtrooms and at the secure entrances to the courthouses. Sheriffs are involved in executing certain court orders such as DNA orders and Protection of Children Against Drugs Act orders.

Sheriffs perform these duties at all Provincial Court of Alberta courthouses, all Court of King's Bench of Alberta courthouses and at the Alberta Court of Appeal.

Out-of-province escorts are completed by CSPT members. Usually consisting of a primary and secondary officer, members assigned to this role perform escorts outside the province to return or transfer prisoners to and from Alberta.

Sheriffs can also be utilized by municipal police services or the RCMP for additional manpower for special events, Integrated Security Units or disaster management such as during the 2013 Alberta floods, the 2016 Fort McMurray wildfire, and most recently the 2019 Alberta wildfires.

Protection services

Legislature and Government Centre Sheriffs (LGCS) provide 24-hour security at the Legislature and Government Centre grounds in Edmonton, and McDougall Centre in Calgary.  Sheriff services are also provided to other key government buildings, and specialized security consultation and audit services are provided to Ministries of the Government of Alberta.
Sheriffs Operational Communications Centre (SOCC) personnel provide provincial radio communications and dispatch for sheriffs, and are the Sheriff Branch's central hub for Canadian Police Information Centre (CPIC) data transfer. 
Executive Protection Unit (EPU) sheriffs provide close personal protection and security to the lieutenant governor of Alberta, premier of Alberta, other members of Cabinet and visiting dignitaries. 
Alberta Security and Strategic Intelligence Support Team (ASSIST) personnel manage security information and intelligence, develop threat assessments, and provide a conduit for the flow of information between government ministries, law enforcement, national security agencies and the private sector as it relates to Alberta's critical infrastructure. 
Energy Security Unit (ESU) personnel provide security services to government officials in relation to energy and utilities in Alberta, and in concert with ASSIST, facilitate the flow of information and intelligence to the energy and utilities sector. 
Technical Security Unit (TSU) personnel coordinate and install security alarms, cameras and locks for government ministries, and facilitate the operational radio system for sheriffs.

Investigation and enforcement operations

Safer Communities and Neighbourhoods Unit (SCAN) teams improve community safety by performing investigations under the Safer Communities and Neighbourhoods Act, targeting properties used for illegal activities such as drugs, gangs and prostitution.  The SCAN Act holds owners accountable for what takes place on their property. Using the provisions contained in the act, a dwelling can be shuttered by court order to temporarily  discourage usage by criminals.
Sheriff Highway Patrol (SHP) perform traffic law enforcement duties in addition to education and awareness initiatives. Traffic sheriffs are deployed to reduce high-risk driving behaviour, improve traffic enforcement on highways, reduce the incidence of injury and fatality collisions, and to restrict drug trafficking throughout the province. In 2021 the SHP mandate were authorized to respond to a broader variety of traffic-related offences as part of the Alberta Provincial Integrated Defence Response program, or “RAPID Response.” 
Sheriffs Investigative Support Unit (SISU) teams provide investigative support to police agencies for major and organized crime investigations within Alberta.

Commercial Vehicle Enforcement 
 
In 2020, Commercial Vehicle Enforcement Branch became part of the Alberta Sheriffs Branch, merging with the Sheriff Highway Patrol. Sheriff commercial vehicle investigator duties include monitoring; weight, mechanical, driver fitness of commercial vehicles at vehicle inspection stations, mobile inspection stations and conducting regular patrols.

Fish and Wildlife Enforcement Services 

In 2020, the Fish and Wildlife Enforcement Branch was merged into the Alberta Sheriffs Branch, as the Fish and Wildlife Enforcement Services. In April 2021, as part of the RAPID Response program, Fish and Wildlife officers were trained and equipped to assist provincial police in responding to emergencies in rural areas, including responding in the first instance, or as backup, to police calls of a priority nature.

Defunct units
Fugitive Apprehension Sheriff Support Team (FASST), were merged into ALERT as the Integrated Fugitive Apprehension Unit (IFAU) in 2012, and were subsequently disbanded as a budgetary measure by the Progressive Conservative government of Alison Redford. This unit's objective was to locate and apprehend wanted individuals within the province of Alberta.
Corporate Security Services (CSS) primary mandate is identifying and managing internal and external threats to the Government of Alberta employees, property and facilities through an integrated security policy and framework. They also administer the security clearance program within the Government of Alberta. They have since been moved to a separate ministry.

Rank 
The rank structure and insignia consists of the following:

Equipment and vehicles

Fleet
Ford Police Interceptor Sedan
Ford Police Interceptor Utility
Dodge Charger Pursuit
Ford Crown Victoria Police Interceptor
Ford F-Series
Dodge Ram
Chevrolet Tahoe
Chevrolet Silverado
Chevrolet Suburban
Ford E-Series

Ford Transit
Harley Davidson Electra Glide 
BMW R1200RT

Equipment
 Glock Model 22
 Glock Model 23
 Glock Model 27
 Benelli Pump Action Shotguns
 Bushmaster AR-15 with C79 optical sights
 SIG Sauer SIG716 G2 patrol rifle
 SIG Sauer SIG516 patrol rifle
 Axon Taser 7

Past equipment
 Smith & Wesson Model 5946 (CAPS)
 Smith & Wesson Model 10 Revolver (CAPS)

See also
 Alberta Law Enforcement Response Teams
 Alberta Provincial Police
 Royal Canadian Mounted Police
 Law enforcement in Canada
 Canadian Police Information Centre

References

External links 
 

Law enforcement agencies of Alberta
Organizations based in Edmonton
2006 establishments in Alberta
Protective security units
Canadian provincial police